Love Like the Falling Petals is a 2022 Japanese film directed by Yoshihiro Fukagawa and written by Tomoko Yoshida, based on the 2017 novel of the same by Keisuke Uyama. It stars Kento Nakajima and Honoka Matsumoto.

Plot
A budding photographer, Haruto meets a young, skilled hairdresser, Misaki. He instantly falls in love at the first sight of her and her nervousness.

Misaki reveals that he was her very first client, which he finds endearing. Haruto bends the truth and introduces himself as a photographer.

Haruto continues to return, to get his hair cut by her and the two start talking. One day, Haruto decides to ask Misaki on a date and brings up the topic while getting his hair cut. Unfortunately, he moves his head and leads her to cut his earlobe, making him pass out.

A few days later, a frantic Misaki meets with him to apologise where he brings up the question of a date, to which she agrees. Misaki’s protective older brother does not approve, however, as he only wants what is best for her.

They go on the date to see sakuras, or cherry blossoms, where Haruto reveals that he is not a photographer currently and is at a crossroads. Misaki surprisingly gets furious and exclaims at him to pursue his passion, to not give up easily.

Haruto, flabbergasted but determined, takes the advice seriously. He gets a job at a photo studio and continues to work hard. He then asks her out again and she accepts, much to his delight.

They go out and have the time of their lives, leading to the two of them dating and enjoying each other’s company.

The smooth sailing story, however, comes to a halt here, as Misaki falls slightly ill, which leads to a doctor’s visit where she is diagnosed with progeroid syndrome, a disease that ages her extremely fast. It also is an extreme case for Misaki, leaving her with less than a year to combat the debilitating symptoms.

Misaki, devastated, goes into seclusion and cuts Haruto off. She also quits her hairdresser job and pretends to have found work elsewhere. After a few months of leaving him in the dark, she lies and pretends to have found someone else, breaking his heart.

She is cared for by her brother, who tries everything to cure her, but to no avail. They even try out expensive electromagnetic therapy, which was done by an external clinic that promised results. This, however, ended badly as the therapy was fake and the clinic was scamming their vulnerable patients looking for hope.

A few months into the year, her disease continues to age her rapidly and slow her functions down, which makes her lose hope in life.

Haruto, although heartbroken, tries to move on. He concentrates on his work and bears the fruits of his efforts, which heals him slightly.

Cast 
 Kento Nakajima
 Honoka Matsumoto

References

External links
 
 

Japanese drama films
Japanese-language Netflix original films
2020s Japanese-language films
2022 drama films
2022 films